The Warsaw Uprising began with simultaneous coordinated attacks at 17:00 hours on August 1, 1944 (W-hour).  The uprising was intended to last a few days until Soviet forces arrived; however, this never happened, and the Polish forces had to fight almost without any outside assistance. Initially the battle raged throughout most of Warsaw, but after a short time it became confined to districts in the West of the town. The key factor in the battle was the massive imbalance of weapons between the two sides. The German side was extremely well equipped whilst the Polish side had, initially, barely enough ammunition for a few days. The policy of one bullet, one German allowed the Polish fighters to sustain the uprising for many weeks at the cost of their own lives. Some areas fought for a full 63 days before an agreed capitulation took place. The losses on the Polish side amounted to 18,000 soldiers killed, 25,000 wounded and over 250,000 civilians killed; those on the German side amounted to over 17,000 soldiers killed and 9,000 wounded.

Although Stalingrad had already shown the level of danger which a city can pose to armies which fight within it and the importance of local support to armies, the Warsaw uprising was probably the first demonstration that in an urban terrain, a vastly under-equipped force supported by the civilian population can hold its own against far better equipped professional soldiers— though at the cost of vast sacrifices on the part of the city's residents.

W-hour 

"W-hour" (from the Polish wybuch, "outbreak"), the moment of the start of the uprising, had been rescheduled for 1 August at 1700 during a briefing on 31 July around 1730.
The change of "W-hour" from 2400 (in earlier plans) to 1700 proved to be a costly strategic decision, reducing the chance of surprising the Germans, especially since many of the Polish partisans were not trained for prolonged day fighting. The order to start the uprising did not reach all of the units (around 23,000 personnel) due to the technological and logistic limitations of the underground movement.

First moves

Fighting broke out before the "W-hour" (scheduled for 1700) in several places where German units encountered organising Polish forces: around 1400 on Żoliborz, 1500 on Czerniaków, 1600 around Plac Napoleona, Hale Mirowskie, Plac Kercelego marketplace, Okopowa street and Mokotów.

Until "W-hour" those separate incidents were not generally perceived as part of a bigger plan. However, around 1600 SS-Standartenfuhrer Paul Otto Geibel, chief of police and SS in the Warsaw District, received a warning about the uprising from an anonymous 'lieutenant of Luftwaffe', who had in turn been warned about it by a Polish woman. He alerted the units under his command, which thus were prepared for the assault at 1700. This drastically reduced the element of surprise of the resistance. On the other hand, while the Germans had been considering the possibility of an uprising, they had no operational plans prepared for such an occasion.

The results of the first two days of fighting in different parts of the city were as follows:

Area I (Śródmieście, Stare Miasto): Units in that area captured most of their assigned territory, but failed to capture strong German pockets of resistance (the Warsaw University buildings, PAST skyscraper, or the headquarters of the German garrison at Piłsudski square). They thus failed to create a central stronghold and secure communications links for other areas. The main failures were in establishing a secure land connection with the northern area of Żoliborz through the northern railway line and the Cytadela fortress as well as failure to capture the bridges over Vistula. The forces mobilized in the city centre also failed to capture the German-only area near the Szucha avenue.

Area II (Żoliborz, Marymont, Bielany): Units here failed to secure the most important military targets in the area of Żoliborz. Many units retreated outside of the city, into the forests. Although the main body of the area was captured, the soldiers of colonel Żywiciel failed to capture the Cytadela fortress area and break through German defences at Warszawa Gdańska railway station. 

Area III (Wola): Units here initially succeeded in securing most of the territory, but sustained heavy losses (up to 30%). Some units retreated into the forests, while others retreated to the eastern part of the area. In the northern part of Wola the soldiers of colonel Radosław managed to capture the German barracks, the German supplies depot at Stawki Street, and the flanking position at the Jewish cemetery. 

Area IV (Ochota): The units mobilized in this area did not capture either the territory or the military targets (the Warsaw concentration camp on Gęsia street, SS barracks and Sipo barracks located in former Students House on Narutowicz square, nicknamed Alcatraz). After suffering heavy casualties most of the forces of the Armia Krajowa retreated to the forests west of Warsaw. Only two small units of approximately 200 to 300 men under lieut. Gustaw stayed in the area and managed to create strong pockets of resistance. They were later reinforced by units from the city centre. Units of Kedyw managed to secure most of the northern part of the area and captured all of the military targets there. However, they were soon tied down by German resistance from the south and west.

Area V (Mokotów): The situation in this area was very serious from the beginning of hostilities. The partisans were to capture the heavily defended and fortified so-called Police Area (Dzielnica policyjna) on Rakowiecka street. Also, they were to establish a connection with the city centre through open terrain at Pola Mokotowskie. None of this succeeded. Some units retreated into the forests, while others managed to capture parts of Dolny Mokotów, which was, however, severed from most communications routes to other areas.

Area VI (Praga): The Uprising was also started on the right bank of the Vistula. The main task of the Area VI (Obwód VI) was to seize the bridges on the river and secure the bridgeheads until the arrival of the Red Army. It was clear that, since the situation was far worse than in other areas, there was no chance for any help from the outside. After some minor initial success, the forces of lt.col. Antoni Władysław Żurowski were badly outnumbered by the German forces concentrated there. The fights were halted, and the Home Army forces located in the Praga area went underground. After the Soviets finally reached the right bank of the Vistula on September 10, the officers proposed recreating the pre-war 36th 'Academic Legion' infantry regiment; however, they were all arrested by the NKVD and sent to Russia for interrogation.

Area VII (Powiat Warszawski): this area consisted of territories outside Warsaw city limits. Actions here mostly failed to capture their targets.

Zgrupowanie Kedywu Komendy Głównej: These units secured parts of Śródmieście and Wola; along with the units of Area I, they were the most successful during the first few hours.

Many primary targets were not achieved on the first and subsequent days. Those included the early plans to capture the PAST building and failed attacks on Okęcie, Pola Mokotowskie and Warszawa Gdańska train station. After the first several hours of fighting many units adopted a more defensive strategy, while the civilian population started erecting barricades throughout the city.

German reinforcements
The Uprising reached its apogee on August 4 when the Home Army soldiers managed to establish frontlines in the Wola and Ochota districts. However, they failed to secure the bridges over the Vistula or bridgeheads on the other side of the river. Also, there were still several German pockets of resistance inside the Polish-controlled territory, most notably the PAST skyscraper, the bridgeheads, and Headquarters of the police.

On that very same day SS general Erich von dem Bach was appointed commander of all the forces fighting the uprising and began concentrating the newly arrived troops. These included Units of Dirlewanger, Schmidt and Reinefarth. The main aim of the German forces was to break through to the German bridgeheads and then cut off the Uprising from the river by attacking both southward and northward.

Wola Massacre 

On August 5 the three German groups started their advance westward along Wolska and Górczewska streets toward the main East-West communication line of Aleje Jerozolimskie Av. Their advance was halted, but the Reinefarth and Dirlewanger regiments started to carry out orders of Heinrich Himmler: behind the lines special groups of SS, police and Wehrmacht went from house to house shooting all inhabitants and burning their bodies. The aim of this policy was to crush the will to fight and put the uprising to an end without having to commit to heavy city fighting. In mass executions approximately 40,000 civilians were slaughtered. At the same time the Zośka and Wacek battalions managed to capture the ruins of the Warsaw Ghetto and the Warsaw concentration camp. The area became one of the main communication links between the insurgents fighting in Wola and those defending the Old Town.

On August 7 the German forces were joined by tanks, with civilians being used as human shields. After two days of heavy fights they managed to cut Wola in two and reach the Bankowy square.

Until mid September, the Germans were shooting all captured resistance fighters on the spot. The main perpetrators were Oskar Dirlewanger and Bronislaw Kaminski, who committed the most cruel atrocities. After von dem Bachs arrived in Warsaw (August 7), it became clear that atrocities only stiffened the resistance and that some political solution should be found, considering the small forces at the disposal of the German commander. The aim was to gain a significant victory to show the Home Army the futility of further fighting and make them surrender. This did not succeed, but from the end of September on, some of the captured Polish soldiers were treated as POWs.

Ochota Massacre 

Simultaneously with the German attack on Wola, the Kaminski Brigade started its onslaught on the Ochota district. The forces defending the area consisted of only two ill-equipped battalions, while the Germans were aided by tanks, artillery and Goliath self-propelled mines. However, the morale of German troops fighting in the area was low, and the main aim of the soldiers fighting there was to loot and rape rather than to attack enemy positions. As a result, the two battalions of the Home Army were able to defend the area with heavy casualties until August 11, when they retreated toward Mokotów.

Old Town 

The Old Town area (Polish Starówka or Stare Miasto) was initially weak and almost undefended. However, it posed a great threat to the German-held bridgehead of the Kierbedź bridge. The Polish positions were close enough to the northern railway line and the Cytadela stronghold to prevent the Germans from effectively using them. Knowing that, the Germans planned to cut off the Old Town both from the north (attack along the railway line toward Vistula) and from the south (attack from the Bankowy sq. Most Kierbedzia bridge). On August 9 the German units from the Mariensztat area captured the Royal Castle, but failed to drive further inland. The Home Army counter-attacked and on August 12 forced the Germans out of Bankowy sq. However, German aerial bombardment and extensive usage of tanks imposed high casualties on both the defenders of the Old Town and the civilians. One of the first buildings to be bombed was a field hospital marked with a huge symbol of the Red Cross on the roof.

A German attack from the north was also halted with heavy casualties on both sides. Heavy city fighting started in the area of Plac Bankowy, with the square and the nearby barricade at Tłomackie street changing hands several times. The Germans managed to establish a link with the German forces under siege in the building of the German Garrison (Mostowski Palace) on August 15, but the huge building became a scene of heavy door-to-door and room-to-room fights. The fights lasted until August 18 when both sides withdrew from the ruins.

The no-mans-land and the covering positions of the Polish defence lines were composed of Warsaw Ghetto ruins and big open areas of Kercelego Square, Żytnia street and Leszno street. The Home Army was not well enough equipped to withstand a German armoured attack in open field. However, the main positions in the Old Town were densely urbanised and covered with small, narrow streets. Because of that, after initial successes in taking the outer rim, the German advance was halted. However, Germans amassed large numbers of artillery for the constant bombardment of the area behind Polish lines. According to von dem Bach himself the number of guns used in the bombardment was as follows:

 220 guns of various calibres
 1 heavy mortar Thor 610mm
 50 Goliath self-propelled mines
 1 company of Nebelwerfer 42/43
 1 battery of Wurfgranate of various calibres (ranging from 150mm to 320mm)
 4 Junkers Ju 87 Stuka dive-bombers operating from the Okęcie airport

The usage of heavy artillery and constant air bombardment (the planes from Okęcie airport needed only five minutes to reach their targets) inflicted heavy casualties on the civilians and destroy the city itself. This aim was expressed in direct orders of Adolf Hitler, Heinrich Himmler and Heinz Guderian.

Despite German superiority, both technical and numerical, the Old Town was held until the end of August. However, the situation of both the Home Army and the civilians became critical: lack of food, water and munitions made further defence of the ruins impossible. Several plans to break through the German positions in Ogród Saski park to the downtown and through the northern railroad to Żoliborz failed. On September 2 the defenders of the Old Town withdrew through the sewers. More than 5,300 men and women were evacuated using this way.

The front lines stabilised for a short while, but during the upcoming days and weeks the German counter-offensive would recapture Żoliborz and the Old Town, splitting the area held by the resistance into three separate sectors, connected only by underground canals.

Sewers and barricades 

The city sewer system became an important communication network for the insurgents, who used the sewers to move under the areas occupied by Germans, thus allowing contact between surrounded positions (insurgents had almost no radios). Sewers were also used as a means of evacuation of areas that couldn't be defended any longer.  Hand-to-hand fighting took place in the pitch blackness, the Germans throwing grenades and gas bombs down manhole covers.

Soviet "help": Berling's landings at Powiśle
In September the eastern part of Warsaw had been captured by the Soviets. In the Praga area Polish units under command of general Zygmunt Berling (thus sometimes known as 'berlingowcy' - 'the Berling men'), the 1st Polish Army (1 Armia Wojska Polskiego) were in position. On the night of 14/15 September three patrols landed on the shore of Czerniaków and Powiśle areas and made contact with Home Army forces. Under heavy German fire only small elements of the main units made it ashore (I and III battalions of 9th infantry regiment, 3rd Infantry Division). At the same time the commanders of the Red Army declined to support the Polish troops with artillery, tanks or bombers.

The Germans intensified their attacks on the Home Army positions near the river to prevent any further landings, which could seriously compromise their line of defence, but weren't able to make any significant advances for several days, while Polish forces held those vital positions in preparation for new expected wave of Soviet landings. Polish units from the eastern shore attempted several more landings, and during the next few days sustained heavy losses (including destruction of all landing boats and most of other river crossing equipment). Other Soviet units limited their assistance to sporadic and insignificant artillery and air support.

Shortly after the Berling landings, the Soviets decide to postpone all plans for a river crossing in Warsaw "for at least 4 months", and soon afterwards General Berling was relieved of his command. On the night of September 19, after no further attempts from the other side of the river were made and the promised evacuation of wounded did not take place, Home Army soldiers and landed elements of Wojsko Polskie were forced to begin a retreat from the positions on the bank of the river.

Out of approximately 3,000 men who made it ashore only around 900 made it back to the eastern shores of Vistula, approximately 600 of them seriously wounded.

Airdrops 
From 4 August the Western Allies begun supporting the Warsaw Uprising with airdrops of munitions and other supplies. Initially the air supply operations were carried out mostly by Polish bomber units (Polish Special Duty Squadron 1586) stationed in Bari and Brindisi in Italy. Later on at the insistence of the Polish government-in-exile they were joined by South African and British units. The drops continued until 21 September. The total weight of allied drops was 104 tons.

The Soviet Union did not give permission to the Allies for use of its airfields for those supply operations; thus the planes were forced to use distant bases in the United Kingdom and Italy, which reduced their carrying weight and number of sorties. The Allies' specific request for the use of landing strips made on 20 August was denied by Stalin on 22 August (he referred to the resistance as 'a handful of criminals').

United States planes did not join the operation. After Stalin's objections to support for the uprising, Churchill telegrammed Roosevelt on August 25, proposing to send planes in defiance of Stalin and 'see what happens'. Roosevelt replied on August 26: 'I do not consider it advantageous to the long-range general war prospect for me to join you in the proposed message to Uncle Joe'.

Although German air defence over the Warsaw area itself was almost non-existent, except for elements of JG52, the highest-scoring fighter squadron (geschwader) in the Luftwaffe, which claimed its 10,000th kill of the war on a Soviet plane over the Warsaw suburb of Praga, about 12% of the 296 planes taking part in the operations were lost. Most of the drops were made at night-time, and poor accuracy left many parachuted packages stranded in German-controlled territory.

From 13 September on the Soviets begun their own airdrop raids with supplies, and dropped about 55 tons in total. The drops continued until 28 September. Since the Soviet airmen did not equip the containers with parachutes, the majority of recovered packages were damaged.

Finally on 18 September the Soviets allowed one USAAF flight of 110 B-17s of the 3 division Eighth Air Force to re-fuel at Soviet airfields used in Operation Frantic, but it was too little too late. A large air-drop from high altitude fell predominantly into German hands.

Of the total of 239 tons of supplies dropped during the 8 weeks by 306 planes of the western Allies, only  88 Tons (36.8%) actually reached the Home Army in Warsaw, the Kabacki woods and the Kampinos forest. The remainder fell into enemy hands or was lost.

Capitulation
At 8 pm on 2 October General Tadeusz Bór-Komorowski signed the capitulation of remaining Polish forces in Warsaw (Warszawski Korpus Armii Krajowej or Home Army Warsaw Corps) at the German headquarters in the presence of General von dem Bach. According to the capitulation treaty the Home Army soldiers were to be treated in accordance with the Geneva Convention, and the civilian population was to be treated humanely.

See also
 Warsaw Uprising the main page of this series

References

Bibliography
 "Rising '44" by Norman Davies, 
 "1859 dni Warszawy" by Władysław Bartoszewski, printed 1974 by Wydawnictwo Znak - Kraków (in Polish)

Warsaw Uprising